Iden is a village and civil parish in the Rother district of East Sussex, England. The village is located two miles (3.2 km) north of Rye.

Iden 12th/13th century parish church is dedicated to All Saints. Iden is also a Domesday Village, and listed in the Domesday Book.

References

External links

Villages in East Sussex
Civil parishes in East Sussex
Rother District